Juma Mnyampanda (born 17 November 1967) is a Tanzanian long-distance runner. He competed in the men's 5000 metres at the 1988 Summer Olympics.

References

1967 births
Living people
Athletes (track and field) at the 1988 Summer Olympics
Tanzanian male long-distance runners
Olympic athletes of Tanzania
Place of birth missing (living people)